Suzon may refer to:

 Suzon (sculpture)
 Suzon (river)

See also 

 Val-Suzon, commune in France
 Suzon de Terson, 17th-century French poet
 Suzon Fuks, artist
 Susan